Frognall is a small village in the South Kesteven district of Lincolnshire, England. It is situated just north-east of Deeping St James , to which it is almost conjoined, and on the Spalding Road, the B1525, which becomes the A1175 road on its route northwards from The Deepings to Spalding. It is within the civil and ecclesiastical parish of Deeping St James.

The village public houses used to be The Goat and the Rose Inn. The Rose Inn closed down in 2013.

External links

Villages in Lincolnshire
The Deepings
South Kesteven District